The 2014 European Mixed Curling Championship was held from September 13 to 20 at the Tårnby Curling Club in Tårnby, Denmark.

Sweden, skipped by Patric Mabergs, won their first European Mixed title after defeating Norway, skipped by Steffen Walstad, with a score of 9–2.

Teams
The teams are listed as follows:

Group A

Group B

Group C

Round robin standings
Final Round Robin Standings

Round robin results
All draw times are listed in Central European Time (UTC+01).

Group A

Sunday, September 14
Draw 1
8:00

Draw 3
16:00

Monday, September 15
Draw 5
8:00

Draw 7
16:00

Tuesday, September 16
Draw 10
12:00

Draw 11
16:00

Wednesday, September 17
Draw 14
12:00

Draw 16
20:00

Thursday, September 18
Draw 18
12:00

Draw 20
20:00

Group B

Sunday, September 14
Draw 2
12:00

Draw 4
20:00

Monday, September 15
Draw 6
12:00

Draw 7
16:00

Tuesday, September 16
Draw 9
8:00

Draw 11
16:00

Wednesday, September 17
Draw 13
8:00

Draw 15
16:00

Thursday, September 18
Draw 17
8:00

Draw 18
12:00

Draw 19
16:00

Group C

Sunday, September 14
Draw 2
12:00

Draw 3
16:00

Draw 4
20:00

Monday, September 15
Draw 6
12:00

Draw 8
20:00

Tuesday, September 16
Draw 10
12:00

Draw 12
20:00

Wednesday, September 17
Draw 14
12:00

Draw 15
16:00

Thursday, September 18
Draw 17
8:00

Draw 19
16:00

Tiebreaker
Friday, September 19, 10:00

Playoffs

Qualification Game
Friday, September 19, 14:30

Quarterfinals
Friday, September 19, 19:00

Semifinals
Saturday, September 20, 10:00

Bronze medal game
Saturday, September 20, 15:00

Gold medal game
Saturday, September 20, 15:00

References

External links
 (web archive)

European Mixed Curling Championship
2014 in curling
Tårnby Municipality
2014 in Danish sport
International curling competitions hosted by Denmark